Fix Your Accent is the debut EP by British DJ and musician Fake Blood. It contains the hit single "I Think I Like It".

Track listing

Charts

References

2009 debut EPs
Fake Blood albums